Prannoy Haseena Sunil Kumar (born 17 July 1992), also known as H. S. Prannoy, is an Indian badminton player who currently trains at the Gopichand Badminton Academy in Hyderabad. Prannoy originally hails from Thiruvananthapuram and has a career-high world ranking of number 8, which he attained in June 2018. He studied at Kendriya Vidyalaya Akkulam.

Career

Early career 
Prannoy came to prominence after winning the silver medal in Boys' singles at the 2010 Summer Youth Olympics. He followed it up with another silver, this time at the Bahrain International Challenge, in 2011. However, as he struggled for form and injuries, Prannoy endured a somewhat barren spell following these achievements.

2013 
In 2013, Prannoy managed to reach the final of the Tata Open International Challenge in Mumbai, eventually losing to compatriot Sourabh Verma in the final.

2014 
In 2014, Prannoy claimed two All India Senior National Ranking Championships: Manorama Indian Open All India Senior Ranking Badminton Tournament, Kerala and the V. V. Natu Memorial All India Senior Ranking Badminton Tournament, Pune. However, it was his exploits on the international circuit that  caught everyone's attention. He was a semi-finalist at  the 2014 India Open Grand Prix Gold, Bitburger Open Grand Prix Gold,2014 Macau Open Grand Prix Gold and the Sri Lanka Open International Badminton Challenge in Colombo.

Prannoy surprised one and all by reaching the final of the 2014 Vietnam Open Grand Prix where he lost to top seed and tournament favourite Dionysius Hayom Rumbaka of Indonesia. In the very next tournament, the Indonesia Open Grand Prix Gold, Prannoy went one better, this time beating local favourite Firman Abdul Kholik of Indonesia in straight sets. He managed to end the year as the third-highest ranked Indian at World no. 21.

2015 
Prannoy started off the year on a good note reaching the semifinals of the 2015 India Open Grand Prix Gold. He put up a spirited performance in the semifinals before bowing out to compatriot Srikanth Kidambi in 3 sets. His greatest victory came in the pre-quarters of the 2015 India Super Series, when he beat an in-form world number 2 Jan Ø. Jørgensen in 3 sets. He played his heart out in the quarter-finals as well, but ultimately suffered defeat to Denmark's Viktor Axelsen.

2016 
Prannoy started 2016 on a good note by beating German ace Marc Zwiebler in the finals of the Swiss Open Grand Prix gold 21–18, 21–15.

2017 
Prannoy played for the Mumbai Rockets franchise in the 2017 season of the Premier Badminton League.
In the 2017 Indonesia Open, he defeated the reigning Olympic silver medalist Lee Chong Wei and the reigning Olympic champion Chen Long in consecutive matches, but lost to Japanese Kazumasa Sakai in the semi-finals.  At the 2017 U.S. Open, he defeated Vietnamese Nguyễn Tiến Minh to reach the finals, where he beat compatriot Parupalli Kashyap to win the title.

2018 
Prannoy participated in the 2018 Commonwealth Games, where he finished in fourth place after being beaten by Rajiv Ouseph of England in the bronze medal match. He then won a bronze medal at the 2018 Asian Championships, after beating second seed Son Wan-ho in the quarterfinals. However, he was defeated in the semifinal by third seed Chen Long.

2021 
Prannoy had a disastrous start to 2021 after exiting in the early rounds of the 2021 Swiss Open and the 2021 All England Open. However, he came back strongly in the second half of the year, most notably defeating reigning Olympic champion Viktor Axelsen in the 2nd round of the 2021 Indonesia Masters in November. He got further success in the 2021 BWF World Championships, held in December, where he upset World no. 9 Ng Ka Long of Hong Kong in the 1st round and World no. 10 Rasmus Gemke in the pre-quarterfinals. He lost to the eventual world champion Loh Kean Yew of Singapore in the quarterfinals. His consistent performances in the last few months of the year enabled him to rise to World no. 27 at the end of the year.

2022 
Prannoy was part of the India squad for the 2022 Thomas Cup. In the quarter-final against Malaysia, he won the decider match against Leong Jun Hao to assure India a semi-final spot and its first-ever medal in the Thomas Cup. He repeated this performance in the semi-final against Denmark, beating Rasmus Gemke in the deciding match to take India to the final, which India eventually won.

Prannoy also had a consistent year on the BWF World Tour, reaching six quarterfinals and two semifinals, as well as the quarterfinal of the 2022 BWF World Championships. This enabled him to re-enter the Top 15 in the BWF World Rankings after 4 years. He also qualified for the BWF World Tour Finals for the first time in his career.

Achievements

Asian Championships 
Men's singles

South Asian Games 
Men's singles

Youth Olympic Games 
Boys' singles

BWF World Junior Championships
Boys' singles

BWF World Tour (1 runner-up)
The BWF World Tour, which was announced on 19 March 2017 and implemented in 2018, is a series of elite badminton tournaments sanctioned by the Badminton World Federation (BWF). The BWF World Tour is divided into levels of World Tour Finals, Super 1000, Super 750, Super 500, Super 300, and the BWF Tour Super 100.

Men's singles

BWF Grand Prix (3 titles, 1 runner-up)
The BWF Grand Prix had two levels, the Grand Prix and Grand Prix Gold. It was a series of badminton tournaments sanctioned by the Badminton World Federation (BWF) and played between 2007 and 2017.

Men's singles

  BWF Grand Prix Gold tournament
  BWF Grand Prix tournament

BWF International Challenge/Series (1 title, 2 runners-up)
Men's singles

  BWF International Challenge tournament
  BWF International Series tournament

Record against selected opponents 
Record against Year-end Finals finalists, World Championships semi finalists, and Olympic quarter finalists. Accurate as of 28 November 2022.

References

External links 
 
 

1992 births
Living people
Sportspeople from Thiruvananthapuram
Racket sportspeople from Kerala
Indian male badminton players
Badminton players at the 2010 Summer Youth Olympics
Badminton players at the 2018 Commonwealth Games
Commonwealth Games gold medallists for India
Commonwealth Games medallists in badminton
Badminton players at the 2018 Asian Games
Asian Games competitors for India
South Asian Games gold medalists for India
South Asian Games silver medalists for India
South Asian Games medalists in badminton
Recipients of the Arjuna Award
Medallists at the 2018 Commonwealth Games